Natural Selection is Fuel's third album, released in 2003 on Epic Records. Despite having the same post-grunge sound as the previous two attempts, it leans more towards heavier alternative metal style.

Preceding the album's release "Won't Back Down" was featured as the lead single of the film soundtrack Daredevil: The Album. "Falls on Me" served as the first single of Natural Selection and received much airplay on MTV throughout the summer. The album also had a third marginally successful single in "Million Miles". The song "Quarter" was featured in the video games Need for Speed: Underground, NFL Street, and NASCAR Thunder 2004.

Background
Following the multi-platinum success of their previous album Something Like Human, Fuel had some setbacks to overcome before they could begin recording the album that became Natural Selection. First off, the band had to resolve some pressing legal matters which prohibited them from recording.

Medical problems also inhibited the recording of the album. In 1998, singer Brett Scallions collided on stage with guitarist–songwriter Carl Bell during the band's Sunburn tour. This left Scallions with a deviated septum that required medical attention. Scallions relearned how to sing after losing his voice during the surgery: "I think I basically had to relearn how to sing... I had to recondition myself and figure out how to sing again."

Bell expressed confidence in Natural Selection, stating "The record is, I think, far and beyond any of the other records we've had as a body of work." Producer Michael Beinhorn has stated that Natural Selection is one of his favorite albums that he's produced.

Reception

Natural Selection debuted at No. 15 on the Billboard 200 album chart, peaking higher than Something Like Human, but only selling about 71,000 copies in its first week of release. The album was later nominated for a Grammy Award in 2004 for Best Engineered Album, Non-Classical.

Aftermath
Natural Selection would prove to be the final Fuel album to feature drummer Kevin Miller and Scallions on vocals. Miller was fired from the band in 2004, and Scallions left in 2006, stating that "... there was no fun in [making the album] because there was no activity within the band." Scallions' feelings of lack of group activity along with Bell's feelings of Scallions vocal troubles led to Scallions' eventual departure from the group. Fuel would release their next album with a new drummer and lead vocalist, and later Scallions reformed Fuel in 2010.

Track listing
All songs written by Carl Bell, except where noted.

Personnel
Band
 Brett Scallions - lead vocals, rhythm guitar
 Carl Bell - lead guitar, keyboards, backing vocals
 Jeff Abercrombie - bass 
 Kevin Miller - drums

Production
 Michael Beinhorn - Producer
 Andy Wallace - Mixing
 Josh Wilbur - Mixing on "Won't Back Down (Bring You Hell Remix)"
 Howie Weinberg - Mastering

References

Fuel (band) albums
Epic Records albums
2003 albums
Albums produced by Michael Beinhorn